Malthace was a Samaritan woman who lived in the latter half of the 1st century BC. She was one of the wives of Herod the Great and the mother by Herod of Herod Antipas, Archelaus, and a daughter, Olympias.
She died in 4 BC at Rome, while her sons Archelaus and Antipas were disputing the will of their father before the emperor Augustus.

Notes

Herodian dynasty
Samaritan culture and history
1st-century BC women
Herod the Great
4 BC deaths
Year of birth unknown
Ancient Jewish women